Paraschistura bampurensis is a species of stone loach that is found in Iran and Pakistan.

References 

bampurensis
Fish of Asia
Fish described in 1900
Taxa named by Alexander Nikolsky